Siettitia is a genus of beetles in the family Dytiscidae, containing the following species:

 Siettitia avenionensis Guignot, 1925
 Siettitia balsetensis Abeille de Perrin, 1904

References

Dytiscidae